Significant Other is the second studio album by American rap rock band Limp Bizkit, released on June 22, 1999, by Flip and Interscope Records. It saw the band expand their sound from that of their 1997 debut Three Dollar Bill, Y'all to incorporate further metal and hip hop influences, but with a more melodic and less hardcore punk-influenced sound.

Significant Other received high commercial sales, peaking at number one on the US Billboard 200. The band's distinctive sound and performance, which was thought to be an improvement over the band's debut, received positive reviews from the critics. At least 16 million copies of the album have been sold worldwide.

Production 
Following the radio success of the band's cover of George Michael's "Faith", the band was determined to record the follow-up to their first album in order to show that they weren't a "Korn ripoff" or a cover band; the band began writing an album which dealt with issues deriving from their newfound fame. Producer Terry Date, known for working with Pantera, White Zombie and Deftones, was chosen by Limp Bizkit to produce Significant Other. Guitarist Wes Borland stated of Date's production, "he doesn't get overly involved at the 'music' end of things. He's a producer who fools with sound and sonically makes everything perfect. He gets sounds that translate really well on tape and pretty much completely captures what we do, perfectly." The band immediately began recording after the conclusion of the Family Values Tour, despite the insistence of Interscope Records that the band take a break after it.

Music and lyrics 
Significant Other has been described as a nu metal and rap metal album. An early version of "I'm Broke" was recorded for Three Dollar Bill, Yall$, but was left off the album because of how different the song sounded from the rest of that album's material. The melody for "Trust?" originated from a melody played in rough form in early 1998, during the Ladies Night in Cambodia tour. In response to claims that the lyrics of Three Dollar Bill, Yall$ were misogynistic, Fred Durst, member of Limp Bizkit, toned down his lyrical content on this album, which he described as being more lyrically mature. Durst's breakup with his girlfriend inspired the songs "Nookie" and "Re-Arranged".

The band allowed Durst and DJ Lethal to explore their hip hop influences by recording with Method Man. DJ Premier of Gang Starr was brought in to produce the collaboration. The band wanted to record "a track that was straight hip-hop", according to Borland. The song was originally titled "Shut the Fuck Up", but was retitled "N 2 Gether Now" for marketing purposes. Durst also recorded a song with Eminem, "Turn Me Loose", which was left off the album. Durst also recorded a song with System of a Down's vocalist Serj Tankian named "Don't Go Off Wandering". Serj's vocals only appeared on the demo version of the song where he sang the bridge and ending chorus but his vocals don't appear on the album version of the song. The band also collaborated with Korn vocalist Jonathan Davis and Scott Weiland of Stone Temple Pilots on "Nobody Like You". Weiland would frequently visit NRG Recording Studios and help with the recording, vocally coaching Durst. Staind singer Aaron Lewis provided backup vocals on the song "No Sex", while Scott Borland, Wes' brother, played keyboards on "Just Like This", "Nookie", "Re-Arranged", "I'm Broke", "9 Teen 90 Nine" and "A Lesson Learned". The song "Show Me What You Got" is a sequel to "Indigo Flow" from Three Dollar Bill, Yall$. "A Lesson Learned" is a psychedelic trip hop track similar to "Everything" from Three Dollar Bill, Yall$.

Describing the album's music, AllMusic's Stephen Thomas Erlewine said that it contains "flourishes of neo-psychedelia on pummeling metal numbers and there are swirls of strings, even crooning, at the most unexpected background." While the band was opposed to solos, they allowed John Otto to perform an extended drum solo in the middle of "Nobody Like You". Scott Borland wrote string melodies for "Don't Go Off Wandering".

The band also recorded interludes featuring celebrity cameos. The first was "Radio Sucks" with MTV VJ Matt Pinfield, in which he rants about "pre-fabricated sorry excuses for singers and musicians who don't even write their own songs" before praising Bizkit for helping launch a musical revolution. The second, "The Mind of Les" featured Primus bass player and singer Les Claypool in what begin as an album intro. Claypool stated, "I came in and they wanted me to write some sort of intro for the record. I got stoned and got in front of the mic and started babbling and they ended up not using the intro and using that instead."

Critical reception 

Significant Other received generally positive reviews from critics. Entertainment Weekly reviewer David Browne wrote, "Significant Other isn't simply modern rock; it's postmodern rock." Robert Christgau gave the album an honorable mention and noted the songs "Just Like This" and "N 2 Gether Now" as highlights of the album, writing, "Give their image credit for having a sound." AllMusic's Stephen Thomas Erlewine called the album "considerably more ambitious and multi-dimensional" than the band's previous album, Three Dollar Bill, Yall$.

In later reviews of the album, About.com's Tim Grierson gave the album 4 out of 5 stars, calling it "A buzz saw of bad attitude, metal guitar and white-boy rapping, Limp Bizkit's breakthrough album, Significant Other, is unapologetically rude and immature. But perhaps more importantly, it also rocks very, very hard." Rolling Stone and its album guide awarded the album three and a half out of five stars. A less favorable notice came from author Martin C. Strong, who gave the album 5 out of 10 stars in his book The Essential Rock Discography. In 2014, Revolver magazine said Significant Other was "one of the great guilty-pleasure hard-rock albums of all time", and listed it as one of ten essential nu metal albums "you need to own."

In 2021, it was named one of the 20 best metal albums of 1999 by Metal Hammer magazine.

Commercial performance 
Significant Other climbed to No. 1 on the Billboard 200, selling 643,874 copies in its first week of release. In its second week of release, the album sold an additional 335,000 copies. The band promoted the album by appearing at Woodstock 1999 and headlining the year's Family Values Tour. Durst directed music videos for the songs "Re-Arranged" and "N 2 Gether Now".

Controversy 

Violent action sprang up during and after Limp Bizkit's performance at Woodstock 1999, including fans tearing plywood from the walls during a performance of the song "Break Stuff". Several sexual assaults were reported in the aftermath of the concert. Durst stated during the concert, "People are getting hurt. Don't let anybody get hurt. But I don't think you should mellow out. That's what Alanis Morissette had you motherfuckers do. If someone falls, pick 'em up. We already let the negative energy out. Now we wanna let out the positive energy". Durst later stated in an interview, "I didn't see anybody getting hurt. You don't see that. When you're looking out on a sea of people and the stage is twenty feet in the air and you're performing, and you're feeling your music, how do they expect us to see something bad going on?" Claypool told the San Francisco Examiner, "Woodstock was just Durst being Durst. His attitude is 'no press is bad press', so he brings it on himself. He wallows in it. Still, he's a great guy."

Durst saw the band as being scapegoated for the event's controversy and later stated that the promoters of Woodstock '99 were at fault for booking his band, due to their reputation for raucous performances. While the performance was the subject of much controversy, the violence did not affect sales of Significant Other. The video for "Re-Arranged" would refer to the controversy, with the band being shown on trial for the events of the concert.

Track listing

 On the digital version, "Outro" and "Radio Sucks" are separated tracks (with "Radio Sucks" renamed to "Rant (Matt Pinfield)") and "The Mind of Les" is omitted.

Personnel
Limp Bizkit
Fred Durst – vocals
Wes Borland – guitars, artwork
DJ Lethal – turntables, keyboards
John Otto – drums
Sam Rivers – bass

Additional musicians
Method Man – vocals on "N 2 Gether Now"
Les Claypool – spoken word on hidden track
Matt Pinfield – spoken word on hidden track
Anita Durst – guitar, vocals on hidden track
Mathematics
Scott Borland – keyboards
Jonathan Davis – vocals on "Nobody Like You"
Aaron Lewis – backing vocals on "No Sex"
Scott Weiland – backing vocals on "Nobody Like You"
Production
Produced by Limp Bizkit, Terry Date, and DJ Premier
Mixed by Brendan O'Brien

Charts

Weekly charts

Year-end charts

Decade-end charts

Certifications

References

Limp Bizkit albums
1999 albums
Flip Records (1994) albums
Albums produced by DJ Premier
Albums produced by Terry Date